Recco is a surname. Notable people with the surname include:

Elena Recco (1654–1700), Italian painter
Giuseppe Recco (1634–1695), Italian painter, father of Elena
Jerry Recco (born 1974), American sports radio personality
Tommy Recco (born 1934), French serial killer